The 1964 Utah gubernatorial election was held on November 3, 1964. Democratic nominee Cal Rampton defeated Republican nominee Mitchell Melich with 56.99% of the vote.

General election

Candidates
Cal Rampton, Democratic
Mitchell Melich, Republican

Results

References

1964
Utah
Gubernatorial